Bariku (also Romanized as Bārīkū; also known as Bārīkūh and Pārī Kūh) is a village in Madvarat Rural District, in the Central District of Shahr-e Babak County, Kerman Province, Iran. At the 2006 census, its population was 23, in 6 families.

References 

Populated places in Shahr-e Babak County